Marthandam College of Engineering & Technology (MACET) is a Private Engineering College located in Kuttakuzhi, Marthandam, Kanyakumari District, Tamil Nadu, India. It was founded in September 2006. Marthandam College of Engineering and Technology (MACET) is the fruit of efforts by the members of Marthandam Educational & Charitable Trust (MECT). The college was approved by All India Council for Technical Education (AICTE) and affiliated with Anna University, Chennai.

Academic Programs

Marthandam College of Engineering & Technology offers following Programs

Under Graduate Degree Programs
 B.E - Civil Engineering
 B.E - Mechanical Engineering
 B.E - Electrical & Electronics Engineering
 B.E - Electronics & Communication Engineering
 B.E - Computer Science & Engineering
 B.Tech - Information Technology

Post Graduate Degree Programs
 M.E - Computer Science & Engineering
 M.E - Power Electronics & Drives
 M.E - VLSI Design

Location

The College is located in Kuttakuzhi village, 6 km from Marthandam Town.  It is located midway between Thiruvananthapuram and Nagercoil in Kanyakumari District, Tamil Nadu. The College campus is linked by road to Eraviputhoorkadai, Swamiyar madam, Attoor, Kulasekaram, Arumanai, Thiruvattar and Mulagumudu, Marthandam. Trivandrum International Airport is 50.8  Kmts away from the College. The campus is spread over 15 acres of land with water supply.

External links
Official College Website
List of Colleges in Kanyakumari district
Arivial Peravai
Success is our reward: Article on The Hindu

References

Engineering colleges in Tamil Nadu
Colleges affiliated to Anna University
Universities and colleges in Kanyakumari district
Educational institutions established in 2006
2006 establishments in Tamil Nadu